John Shelton (born Edward Sheppard Price; May 18, 1915 – May 17, 1972) was an American actor. He appeared in more than thirty films from 1936 to 1952.

Personal life
Shelton was the son of Ernest Edward Price and grandson of creationist George McCready Price.  He named one of his sons Darwin to "balance everything out".

Shelton was married five times. His first four marriages were childless and ended in divorce, while he and his fifth wife had four children before his death.

He was married to Sally Sage from 1938 to 1940, actress Kathryn Grayson from 1941 to 1946, Marti Stanley from 1946 to 1948, Irene Winston from 1948 to 1953, and Lorraine Ludwig from October 3, 1953, until his death. He and Ludwig had 4 children together.  Musician Tom Price is his son and singer Rachael Price is his granddaughter.

Death
He died mysteriously in a prison in Sri Lanka.

Selected filmography
John Shelton has about 40 acting credits, 38 movies and 2 TV series.

References

External links 

1915 births
1972 deaths
American male film actors
20th-century American male actors